Simone Paolini (born 2 April 1997) is an Italian footballer who plays as a midfielder for  club Fidelis Andria.

Club career
He made his professional debut in the Serie B for Ascoli on 3 December 2016 in a game against Avellino.

On 26 July 2019, he signed a 2-year contract with Serie C club Fano.

On 31 January 2022, Paolini signed with Pistoiese.

On 24 August 2022, Paolini joined Fidelis Andria.

References

External links
 

1997 births
Living people
People from San Benedetto del Tronto
Sportspeople from the Province of Ascoli Piceno
Footballers from Marche
Italian footballers
Association football midfielders
Serie B players
Serie C players
Ascoli Calcio 1898 F.C. players
U.S. Città di Pontedera players
A.C. Cuneo 1905 players
Alma Juventus Fano 1906 players
U.S. Pistoiese 1921 players
S.S. Fidelis Andria 1928 players